Maurice Riel,  (April 3, 1922 – July 20, 2007) was a Canadian lawyer and Senator.

A distant relative of Louis Riel, Maurice Riel studied law and was admitted to the bar of Quebec in 1945. Establishing his own law firm in Montreal with Louis-René Beaudoin under the name Beaudoin, Riel Geoffrion & Vermette, Riel worked in international law with a number of clients in France. He also practiced at Dunton Rainville. He was appointed Queen's Counsel in 1958, and served as chairman of the Metropolitan Montreal Corporation from 1965 to 1969. He served on the board of the Bank of Canada from 1969 to 1973.

Riel joined the Liberal Party of Canada in 1947, and served in various capacities with the party. He was appointed to the Senate on the advice of Prime Minister    Pierre Trudeau in 1973, and worked on immigration policy and foreign affairs amongst other issues. He was appointed Speaker of the Senate of Canada on December 16, 1983, but served for less than a year in that position due to the Progressive Conservative Party's victory in the 1984 general election. He was replaced as Speaker by Progressive Conservative Guy Charbonneau.

Riel remained active in the Senate until his retirement in 1997. He died on July 20, 2007.

References

External links
 
 The Gazette, May 24, 1958

1922 births
2007 deaths
Members of the King's Privy Council for Canada
Speakers of the Senate of Canada
Canadian senators from Quebec
Canadian King's Counsel